Estancia is a Spanish term referencing a large rural estate. It may also refer to:

Places 
 Estancia, New Mexico
 Estancia, Iloilo
 Estância, Sergipe
 Estância Velha
 Microregion of Estância (pt)
 Estacia, a municipality of Santa Bárbara Department, Honduras

Other uses 
Estancia, a ballet by Alberto Ginastera

See also
 La Estancia (disambiguation)
 Roman Catholic Diocese of Estância
 Estancia High School